George Howell (born 1945) is an American entrepreneur and one of the pioneers of the specialty-coffee movement in the United States in the early 1970s.  He was the founder of The Coffee Connection, a high-end coffee retailer based in Boston, Massachusetts which was acquired by Starbucks Corporation in 1994 and formed the nexus of their expansion into the Boston area.  He is the founder of George Howell Coffee.

Coffee pioneer 

In 1974, Howell and his wife Laurie moved to Boston. Of the trip back East Howell has said "In 1974 we [decided] to leave the West Coast, I already had two kids with another on the way.  We decided to move east to Boston. We drove cross-country. I took with me some whole bean coffee and a grinder.  We stopped at the various Howard Johnson’s that were on the interstates on our way and I would go into men’s room, grind the coffee there, leaving it smelling a whole lot better than when I walked in, and then I would take out my French press on the counter, ask for hot water for 35 cents and make my French press at the Howard Johnson’s counter. And within minutes I would always have several people around me wondering what that was, and this is before I even had any clue that I would get into a coffee business."

When they arrived, they were disappointed with the appalling quality of the local coffee. By the time Howell had left Berkeley, a West Coast coffee pioneer Alfred Peet was already successfully established in the Bay Area and had already inspired Starbucks founders Jerry Baldwin, Zev Siegl and Gordon Bowker to start their own high-quality coffee store further north in Seattle.  Howell and his wife had developed a taste for the strong, flavorful coffee available around San Francisco.  But the East Coast was different.  He has said that "Boston was a desert of stale, brown-painted wooden pellets and liquified ground saw dust."  Though high-quality coffees had been popular in the United States at earlier points in its history, Americans' taste for strong, flavorful coffee declined during World War II.  Severe rationing of coffee supplies at home and the wide consumption of the newly developed instant, freeze-dried coffee among soldiers caused American coffee palates to devolve.  Though espresso or 'Italian coffee' did emerge as a micro-niche product in Beatnik bars of the 1950s, weak-tasting, cheap canned coffee made in percolators and on diner hot plates was the rule of the day until Alfred Peet started his company and began to elevate the tastes in the late 1960s.

The Coffee Connection 
Seeking to advance the quality of coffee in Boston to what he was accustomed to in California, Howell began to educate himself about the cultivation, processing, roasting and brewing of fine coffees.  He founded The Coffee Connection which opened its first retail store in Harvard Square, Cambridge, Massachusetts, in 1975 serving coffee drinks and selling whole-bean coffee and coffee-making paraphernalia.  Howell approached his coffee slightly differently than Peet and the others in the West.  Whereas West Coast coffee was predicated on a rich, strong, dark roast, Howell believed that a light "cinnamon roast" was better suited to bringing out the nuanced flavors of high-quality coffee beans which he compared to the subtle flavor characteristics of fine wine. However, very dark, thick coffee was served throughout his stores in the 1990s to compete with the likes of Starbucks. He also promulgated the notion of "single-origin" or "single-estate" coffees as opposed to beans blended from multiple sources.  Howell worked to develop relationships with various coffee plantations the world over, overseeing the entire process from the selection of the beans to roasting and cupping.  As coffee loses its potency gradually (from exposure to oxygen) from the time it is roasted, Howell instituted a policy of roast-dating his coffee beans.  Coffee that was unsold after seven days was donated to charity.  Coffee drinkers in Massachusetts responded enthusiastically to his products.  By the 1990s The Coffee Connection had grown into a chain of 24 company-owned stores in the Boston area.

Starbucks buyout 

By the early 1990s, the Starbucks Corporation, under the leadership of CEO Howard Schultz, was expanding aggressively in major urban U.S markets. Facing an increasingly competitive market and weary from the time-consuming demands of running the Coffee Connection, George Howell sold his Boston-area stores to Starbucks in 1994.  Subsequently, Starbucks appropriated the Coffee Connection's popular Frappuccino beverage and made it available chain-wide.  Howell continued to travel the world, visiting a range of coffee-producing countries and working as a coffee consultant.  Beginning in 1997, he worked for the United Nations and the International Coffee Organization (ICO), creating models of economic sustainability for coffee farmers.  In 1999 he conceived and co-founded a program designed to help break the commodity/price cycle in the specialty-coffee industry.  In 2002 Howell returned to the retail coffee market, when he founded the George Howell 'Terroir' Coffee Company, which sells whole bean single-estate coffees through a website.

Coffee storage revolution 

Raw coffee has traditionally been shipped from its country of origin in woven jute sacks. Howell has likened this practice to shipping wine overseas "in open vats". Since 2001, Howell has been the engine in a movement away from jute sacks for high-end coffees, with airtight bags being the replacement. At Terroir he takes a further step, and deep freezes the raw beans. The benefit this method has for the flavor of coffee has been covered in Wine Spectator and is supported by a healthy consensus.

On October 2, 2010 Howell announced his return to retail coffee with the acquisition of Taste Coffee House in Newton, Massachusetts in order to have more face to face interaction with coffee consumers.

Awards 

In 1996 Howell was awarded the Specialty Coffee Association of America's (SCAA) Lifetime Achievement Award in recognition of his "critical role as a pioneering standard bearer of quality coffee."

In 2007 Howell was awarded the Specialty Coffee Association of Europe's (SCAE) Better Coffee World Award. It is the Association's highest honor.

References

External links
Article Featuring the life of George Howell from Boston Magazine

1945 births
Living people
Businesspeople in coffee
American people of Welsh descent
Yale University alumni
Starbucks people